Janet Jackson is the debut studio album by American singer-songwriter Janet Jackson, released on September 21, 1982 by A&M Records. Janet Jackson is described as a dance and contemporary R&B record. Songwriters Angela Winbush and René Moore contributed to much of the album's lyrics. Moore and Winbush share production credits with Foster Sylvers, Jerry Weaver, and Bobby Watson. On release Janet Jackson charted on the Billboard 200 and in New Zealand. Three singles from the album had little impact on Billboard Hot 100 charts, among them "Young Love", "Come Give Your Love to Me" and "Say You Do", though these singles achieved success on the R&B charts. Jackson performed "Young Love" and "Say You Do" on American TV shows American Bandstand and Soul Train in 1982. The cover artwork of Jackson's body submerged in water was based on a photo of Elizabeth Taylor. Worldwide, the album has sold 300,000 copies.

Production
Jackson was sixteen when she began recording the album. She was assisted by her father, working with a number of songwriters and producers. Songwriters Angela Winbush and René Moore contributed to much of the album's lyrics. Moore and Winbush share production credits with Foster Sylvers, Jerry Weaver, and Bobby Watson.

The cover photo was shot by Harry Langdon in the swimming pool of the Jackson family's home. Jackson took the idea from a photograph of actress Elizabeth Taylor submerged in a swimming pool early in her career, which she found "dramatic".

Release
The album was released on September 21, 1982, by A&M Records. The Baltimore Afro-American noted that the album had been released, commenting that Jackson does not have any members of the Jackson family helping out, that she is relying "solely on her own talent", and that she has "the poised voice of a dynamic individual."

On the US Billboard 200, Janet Jackson had its peak at number 63 the week of January 22, 1983. In New Zealand, the album peaked at number 44 on the New Zealand Albums Chart, during its only-week chart on April 17, 1983. As of 2003, Janet Jackson sold 82,000 copies through BMG Music Club in the United States. And sold additional 62,000 copies according to Soundscan since 1991. But the majority of the sales occurred before Soundscan began tracking sales in the US in 1991. Worldwide, the album has sold 300,000 copies, considered a failure at the time.

Singles
Five singles were released from the album. "Young Love" was the first. It reached number 64 on the principal American singles chart, the Billboard Hot 100, and number six on the American Hot R&B/Hip-Hop Songs chart. In New Zealand, "Young Love" reached number 16. The second single from Janet Jackson was "Come Give Your Love to Me" and peaked at number 58 on the Hot 100. The follow-up single, "Say You Do", only appeared on the Hot R&B/Hip-Hop Songs and the Hot Dance Club Songs charts, peaking at numbers 15 and 11, respectively. The last two singles from the album, "Love and My Best Friend" and "Don't Mess Up This Good Thing" did not appear on any chart worldwide. In order to further promote Janet Jackson, she performed "Young Love" and "Say You Do" on American TV shows American Bandstand and Soul Train in 1982.

Reception
In a retrospective summary for AllMusic, Stephen Thomas Erlewine felt the album had "no distinctive musical personality", feeling that the choice of songs was poor, with "Young Love" as the only song which "stands out among the undistinguished, sub-disco thumpers and drippy ballads". Bil Carpenter from the same website called Janet Jackson a "debut album of youth-oriented pop". The Rolling Stone Album Guide book stated that the album and its follow-up Dream Street (1984) sound like bland dance-music ready-mades.

Track listing

 "Say You Do" (12" single remix) is on the CD album. The original version (timed at 5:20) appears on the LP and cassette releases of the album.

Personnel

 Janet Jackson – lead vocals
 Bobby Watson, James Jamerson, Jr., Leon Sylvers III, Ricky Smith – bass guitar
 Foster Sylvers – synthesizer, bass, drums, producer, rhythm arrangements
 Marlo Henderson, Greg Moore, Tony Maiden, Fred West, Michael McGloiry,Fred Jenkins, Pepper Read – guitars
 Paulinho Da Costa, Edmund Sylvers, Melvin Webb – percussion
 André Fischer, John JR Robinson – drums
 Wardell Potts, Jr. – drums, rhythm arrangements
 René Moore – keyboards, background vocals, handclapping, producer, rhythm arrangements, Moog bass
 Angela Winbush – keyboards, background vocals, producer, rhythm arrangements
 Phillip Ingram – keyboards, string machine, background vocals
 Joey Gallo – keyboards, synthesizer
 Eddie Fluellen – string machine
 Jerry Hey – horn arrangements
 Humberto Gatica – mixing
 Stuart Furusho – engineer, mixing assistant
 Kirk Ferraioli – assistant engineer
 Gene Dozier – keyboards, horn arrangements, string arrangements
 Jeff Lorber, Barry Sarna, Ian Underwood – synthesizers
 Attala Zane Giles – background vocals
 Monica Joy Rhodes, Wendell C. Wellman – handclaps 
 Dana Meyers – background vocals, vocal arrangement
 Howard Hewett – background vocals
 Chuck Beeson – art direction
 Bob Brown – engineer
 Jerry Knight – background, vocals
 Harry Langdon – photography
 Nyya Lark – assistant engineer
 Peggy McCreary – mixing assistant
 Taavi Mote – engineer
 Ambrose Price – handclapping
 Lynn Robb – design
 John Stronach – engineer
 Steve Thume – engineer
 Wally Traugott – mastering
 John VanNest – engineer, mixing assistant
 Trevor Veitch – contractor
 Gerald Vinci – concertmaster
 Jerry Weaver – producer, rhythm arrangements, synthesizer
 Benjamin Wright – string arrangements

Charts

Weekly charts

Year-end charts

References

External links
Janet Jackson Image Page at janetjackson.com 

1982 debut albums
A&M Records albums
Janet Jackson albums
Albums produced by Angela Winbush
Albums recorded at Wally Heider Studios
Albums recorded at Sunset Sound Recorders